Pantelleria (Sicilian: Pantiddirìa), the ancient Cossyra or Cossura, is an Italian island and comune in the Strait of Sicily in the Mediterranean Sea,  southwest of Sicily and  east of the Tunisian coast. On clear days Tunisia is visible from the island. Administratively Pantelleria's comune belongs to the Sicilian province of Trapani.

The population of Pantelleri was 7,335 in 2022, according to istat.it.

Description
The last eruption occurred below sea level in 1891, and today phenomena related to volcanic activity are present, such as hot springs and fumaroles. The islanders speak Pantesco, a dialect of Sicilian influenced by Arabic.

Names

The Greek geographers recorded it as Kossyra and Kossyros, which became the Latin . This appears in Arabic as Qawṣirah and Maltese as the former name .

The original Arab name for the island was Bint al-Riyāh (Arabic:  and Maltese: Bint l-Irjieħ), meaning "Daughter of the Winds" after the strong gales that can arise off the north coast of Africa.

History 

The earliest evidence of human activity dates to the Neolithic period distinguished for its use of obsidian tools and construction of stone structures and tombs known locally as "Sese". 
 
The original population of Pantelleria did not come from Sicily, but were of Iberian or Ibero-Ligurian ancestry. After a considerable interval, during which the island probably remained uninhabited, the Carthaginians took possession of it, no doubt owing to its importance as a station on the way to Sicily. This probably occurred around the beginning of the 7th centuryBC. The town has considerable remains of walls made of rectangular blocks of masonry and also of a number of cisterns. Punic tombs have been discovered, and the votive terra-cottas of a small sanctuary of the Punic period were found near the north coast.

The Romans occupied the island as the Fasti Triumphales record in 255BC, lost it again the next year, and recovered it in 217BC. It struck bronze coins, originally with a Punic inscription but changing to Latin by the 1st centuryBC. Under the empire, it served as a place of banishment for prominent persons and members of the imperial family. The town enjoyed municipal rights.

In AD700, Arabs conquered the island. In 1123, Roger II of Sicily took the island, and in 1311 an Aragonese fleet under the command of Lluís de Requesens won a considerable victory here. Requesens's family became princes of Pantelleria until 1553, when the Turks captured the island. A naval battle took place near the island in July 1586 when an armed English merchant fleet of five ships managed to repel an attack by eleven Spanish and Maltese galleys.

A Siculo-Arabic dialect similar to Maltese was the vernacular of the island until the late 18th century, when the Romance Sicilian superseded it. The modern Sicilian language in Pantelleria contains many Arabic loanwords, and most of the island's place names are of Semitic origin.

During the Napoleonic Wars, the British considered the possibility of taking over Pantelleria (together with Lampedusa and Linosa) so as to be able to supply Malta, but a Royal Commission stated in an 1812 report that there would be considerable difficulties in this venture.

Pantelleria's capture was regarded as crucial to Operation Husky, the Allied invasion of Sicily in 1943 as planes based on Pantelleria could readily reach Sicily. In Operation Corkscrew the Allies bombarded Pantelleria heavily from air and sea in the days before the invasion. The garrison surrendered as the landing troops approached. Pantelleria then became a vital base for Allied aircraft during the assault on Sicily.

Archaeological sites
Remains of huts were found there, with pottery, tools of obsidian, and other artifacts. These objects are in the museum at Syracuse.

To the southeast, in the district known as the Cunelie, are many tombs, known as sesi. They are similar in character to the nuraghe of Sardinia, though of smaller size, and consist of round or elliptical towers with sepulchral chambers in them, built of rough blocks of lava. Fifty-seven of them can still be traced. The identical character of the pottery found in the sesi with that found in the prehistoric village proves that the former are the tombs of the inhabitants of the latter.

Monuments and other buildings 
The island has scattered typical one-level buildings called dammuso of unknown but probably remote origins. A dammuso is a dry stone building with thick walls that usually appear black due to the extensive use of volcanic rock. They have characteristic domes on top painted white to avoid overheating. The domes collect rainwater that is directed to a large tank (usually below the building) or to the nearby soil for use in the dry season.

Most of the other constructions were destroyed during the Second World War. One notable exception is the castle Barbacane, a renaissance building formed by an irregularly quadrangular plan with internal court joined to a squared base tower.

Geology 

The island of Pantelleria is located above a drowned continental rift in the Strait of Sicily and has been the focus of intensive volcano-tectonic activity. The 15 kilometre-long island is the emergent summit of a largely submarine edifice. Two large Pleistocene calderas dominate the island, the older of the two formed about 114,000 years ago and the younger Cinque Denti caldera formed about 45,000 years ago. The eruption that formed the Cinque Denti caldera produced the distinctive green tuff deposit that covers much of the island, and is found across the Mediterranean, as far away as the island of Lesbos in the Aegean. Holocene eruptions have constructed pumice cones, lava domes, and short, blocky lava flows.

Later activity constructed the cone of Monte Gibele, part of which was subsequently uplifted to form Montagna Grande. Several vents are located on three sides of the uplifted Montagna Grande block on the southeast side of the island. A submarine eruption in 1891 from a vent off the northwest coast is the only confirmed historical activity.

Currently the island is subsiding, and Montagna Grande is slowly sinking. This is thought to be caused by the magma beneath the volcano cooling and degassing. There are numerous hot springs and fumaroles on the island due to an active hydrothermal system. Favara Grande, in the south east of the island, is one of the best examples. The island is releasing a small amount of CO2 through passive degassing.
Total carbon stock in the first  of soil of Pantelleria is about 230,000 tonnes.
The island is the type locality for peralkaline rhyolitic rocks, pantellerites.

Climate
Pantelleria has a subtropical Mediterranean climate (Köppen: Csa) characterized by very warm to hot, almost rainless and humid summers, very mild and frost-free winters, a powerful seasonal lag and a small diurnal temperature range. The constant sea breezes, moderate the daytime summer temperatures. Coastal Pantelleria (along with Lampedusa and coastal Malta) is one of the very few areas along the Mediterranean Sea coast, which have never recorded frost. Below freezing temperatures and snow only and sporadically occur at Montagna Grande and at higher elevations on the island. Despite the very dry summers and the fairly low annual precipitation, the dry season is noticeably shorter at four months, and the rainy season lasts at least for eight months.

Environment

Specchio di Venere (literally "Venus' mirror") is a natural lake formed in an extinct volcanic crater, and fed by rain and hot springs.
Other natural attractions are paths to the sea, a large network of trekking paths, hot springs, and a popular natural sauna fed by vapours filtering through rocks in a small cave. Also situated on the Island is Laghetto delle Ondine ("Pond of the ripples" or "Pond of the wavelets") a seawater lake which has developed into a very desired swimming hole.

The island has been recognised as an Important Bird Area (IBA) by BirdLife International because it supports a population of Eleonora's falcons, with some 35–40 breeding pairs estimated in 1994.

Wine 

Pantelleria is noted for its sweet wines, Moscato di Pantelleria and Moscato Passito di Pantelleria, both made from the local Zibibbo grape. In 2014, the traditional agricultural practice of cultivating the vite ad alberello (head-trained bush vines) of the community of Pantelleria was inscribed on the Representative List of the Intangible Cultural Heritage of Humanity of UNESCO.

Transport 
The island is served by Pantelleria Airport, which is served by DAT, connecting Trapani and Palermo and other companies in summer, connecting the island with Italian cities such as Milan, Rome, Venice and others. Ferries reach the island from Trapani, and it is near the main east–west route through the Mediterranean Sea.

Gallery

See also
 List of islands of Italy
 List of volcanoes in Italy
 Italy–Tunisia Delimitation Agreement

References

Bibliography
 
 .
 .

External links 

 parconazionalepantelleria.it

Carthage
Holocene volcanoes
Inactive volcanoes
Islands of Sicily
Municipalities of the Province of Trapani
Pleistocene calderas
Calderas of Italy
Volcanoes of Italy
Wine regions of Italy
Islands of Africa
Phoenician colonies in Sicily
Important Bird Areas of Italy
Important Bird Areas of Mediterranean islands